Kwasa may refer to:
 Kwasa Damansara, a township development in Malaysia
 Kwassa kwassa, a dance rhythm from the Democratic Republic of Congo

See also 
 Kwaza (disambiguation)